White Thunder is a 1925 American silent Western film directed by Ben F. Wilson and starring Yakima Canutt, William H. Turner, and Lew Meehan.

Plot
As described in a film magazine review, shortly after Chick Richards' father, who is the local sheriff, is killed, the youth enters an Eastern college. An ace of spades was on the arm of the murderer of the father. A feud breaks out between cattle ranchers and sheep farmers. A card of the ace of spades is found as a warning to one of the men. Black Morgan's gang is repulsed when the other cowboys are championed by a masked rider clothed in white. Chick returns from college, dressed in white flannels and wearing a cane. His sweetheart Alice and others become disgusted with Chick appears to have no interest in solving the mystery of his father's death. Then Alice is attacked by Black Morgan. The rider in white appears, throws off his outer robe to fight Morgan, and everyone sees that it is Chick. Morgan is whipped and he and his gang are put in jail. Chick becomes sheriff and later marries Alice.

Cast

References

Bibliography
 Connelly, Robert B. The Silents: Silent Feature Films, 1910-36, Volume 40, Issue 2. December Press, 1998.
 Munden, Kenneth White. The American Film Institute Catalog of Motion Pictures Produced in the United States, Part 1. University of California Press, 1997.

External links
 

1925 films
1925 Western (genre) films
1920s English-language films
American silent feature films
Silent American Western (genre) films
American black-and-white films
Films directed by Ben F. Wilson
Film Booking Offices of America films
1920s American films